The Argippaeans or Argippaei are a people mentioned by Herodotus in his The Histories. They were cited to be living north of the Scythians, and much of the scholarship points to them being a tribe near the Ural Mountains. There are scholars who believe that Herodotus could be talking about the Mongolians based on their physical description as well as their culture.

Herodotus only relied on secondary sources for his account, drawing from descriptions of Greeks and Scythians such as the detail about the Argippaeans as bald people. They were said to have settled in a land that is flat and deep-soiled. This was believed to be in the outliers of the Altai mountains while the T'ien Shan lies on the other side. just before, an impenetrable barrier of mountains called eremos.

In Herodotus

References

Further reading
 

Ancient peoples of Russia
Tribes described primarily by Herodotus